Lytoceras eudesianum is an ammonite species belonging to the family Lytoceratidae. These fast-moving nektonic carnivores lived from the Bajocian age to the Bathonian age of the Middle Jurassic.

References
Ammonites.fr
Crioceratites
Bajocien14

Jurassic ammonites
Lytoceratidae